Sidney L. Miller (born Sid Miller; October 22, 1916 – January 10, 2004) was an American actor, director and songwriter.

Biography
Sidney Miller was born in Shenandoah, Pennsylvania.

His first acting role was in the movie Penrod and Sam (1931), although uncredited. In 1937, he made his radio debut on the Jack Benny Program episode "Christmas Shopping", as a man whom Benny mistakes for a department store floorwalker. The actor was also a regular performer on Cavalcade of America, Suspense and Nightbeat. Miller had a small, but memorable role, as would-be wrestling announcer Mo Kahn in MGM's Boys Town (1938), alongside Mickey Rooney. He reprised the character in the sequel, Men of Boys Town (1941).

He co-starred and co-directed, alongside his good friend Donald O'Connor, in one of the first musical sitcoms on television, Here Comes Donald. After joining Disney, he wrote for and directed The Mickey Mouse Club (1955).

Miller directed episodes of numerous successful television programs throughout the 1950s and 1960s, including Damon Runyon Theater, Bachelor Father, Peter Loves Mary, Get Smart, Bewitched, The Ann Sothern Show and My Mother the Car. (He had been a regular on Sothern's radio show The Adventures of Maisie.)

In 1958, he played Roscoe Dewitt, an impressionist who bothers Bob Collins in The Bob Cummings Show episode "Bob Judges a Beauty Pageant". In 1968's Yours, Mine and Ours, he played Doctor Ashford, Helen North's (Lucille Ball) date who was shorter than her three children. In 1974, he briefly appeared as a drunk driver in the Michael Sarrazin and Barbra Streisand comedy For Pete's Sake.

From 1983 to 1985, Miller played the voice of The Dungeon Master in the animated series Dungeons & Dragons, which was based on the role-playing game of the same name. He also provided voices for several other animated shows.

In 1980, Miller and O'Connor had a nightclub show described as "a fast-paced vaudeville act" that they performed in cities including Denver, New Orleans, Philadelphia, and San Francisco.

In the 1980s and 1990s, he had a small role as Slow-Burn in Memories of Me, appeared as Sol on The Father Dowling Mysteries episode "The Confidence Mystery" in 1990 and also dubbed the voice of Oompe for the 1992 American version of Little Nemo: Adventures in Slumberland. He had retired by the late 1990s.

He was married three times, and had an actor son, Barry Miller, from his marriage to Iris Burton. Miller died in Los Angeles from Parkinson's disease on January 10, 2004. His resting place is in Hollywood Forever Cemetery.

Selected filmography

As actor

1931: Penrod and Sam as Maurice Levy (uncredited)
1932: Symphony of Six Million as Magnus - as a Boy (uncredited)
1932: Forgotten Commandments as Student (uncredited)
1932: Lady and Gent as Member of 8th Grade Graduating Class (uncredited)
1932: Three on a Match as Willie Goldberg (uncredited)
1932: The Penguin Pool Murder as Isadore Marks - Student with Glasses (uncredited)
1932: Lawyer Man as Boy Behind Olga at End (uncredited)
1933: Hard to Handle as Boy on Pier (uncredited)
1933: The Mayor of Hell as Izzy
1933: Mary Stevens, M.D. as Sanford Nussbaum (uncredited)
1933: This Day and Age as Harold Miller (uncredited)
1933: Rafter Romance as Julius
1933: Wild Boys of the Road as Boy Selling Letter (uncredited)
1933: East of Fifth Avenue as Messenger (uncredited)
1934: The Big Shakedown as Boy Buying Ice Cream (uncredited)
1934: Hi, Nellie! as Louie (uncredited)
1934: The Show-Off as Gatekeeper at Box Factory (uncredited)
1934: Harold Teen as Sugar Bowl Patron (uncredited)
1934: The Hell Cat as Copy Boy (uncredited)
1934: Our Daily Bread as Cohen's Son (uncredited)
1934: Desirable as First Western Union Messenger (uncredited)
1934: When Strangers Meet as Leon Rosinsky
1934: One Hour Late as Orville (uncredited)
1934: The Band Plays On as Rosy as a Boy
1935: Dinky as Sammy
1935: The Girl Who Came Back as Boy (uncredited)
1935: Silk Hat Kid as George Washington (uncredited)
1936: The Little Red Schoolhouse as Sidney Levy
1936: One Rainy Afternoon as Doorman (uncredited)
1936: The Bride Walks Out as Second Florist Delivery Boy (uncredited)
1936: Women Are Trouble as Copy Boy (uncredited)
1936: Piccadilly Jim as Messenger Boy (uncredited)
1936: Stage Struck as Wilbur's Friend (uncredited)
1936: Cain and Mabel as Call Boy (uncredited)
1937: The Big Shot as Newsboy (uncredited)
1938: Reckless Living as Jockey (uncredited)
1938: Boys Town as Mo Kahn
1938: Cipher Bureau as Jimmy
1939: Scouts to the Rescue as Hermie - a Boy Scout
1939: Panama Patrol as Jimmy, Office Boy
1939: Streets of New York as Jiggsy
1939: Andy Hardy Gets Spring Fever as Sidney
1939: Babes in Arms as Sid (uncredited)
1939: What a Life as Pinkie Peters
1939: 20,000 Men a Year as Irving Glassman
1940: Golden Gloves as Sammy Sachs
1940: City for Conquest as Band Conductor and Emcee (uncredited)
1940: Strike Up the Band as Sid - a Student (uncredited)
1940: Little Nellie Kelly as Boy at Dance (uncredited)
1941: Men of Boys Town as Mo Kahn
1941: Life Begins for Andy Hardy as Young Man at Hotel (uncredited)
1941: Henry Aldrich for President as Sidney
1941: Melody Lane as Page Boy (uncredited)
1941: Babes on Broadway as Tony (uncredited)
1942: Don't Get Personal as Elevator Boy (uncredited)
1942: Mr. Wise Guy as Charlie Horse
1942: Alias Boston Blackie as Herman - Bellhop (uncredited)
1942: Syncopation as Herbert (uncredited)
1942: Private Buckaroo as Jeep Driver (uncredited)
1942: Get Hep to Love as Boy Waiter (uncredited)
1942: Madame Spy as Newsboy (uncredited)
1942: When Johnny Comes Marching Home as Hot-Dog Vendor (uncredited)
1943: It Comes Up Love as Page Boy (uncredited)
1943: Hi Diddle Diddle as Benny (uncredited)
1943: Top Man as Higgins - Soda Jerk (uncredited)
1943: Here Comes Kelly as Sammy Cohn
1943: Moonlight in Vermont as Cyril
1944: Chip Off the Old Block as Soda Clerk (uncredited)
1944: Hi, Good Lookin'! as Messenger Boy (uncredited)
1944: Hot Rhythm as Sammy Rubin
1944: Wing and a Prayer, The Story of Carrier X as Sailor (uncredited)
1945: Babes on Swing Street as Corny Panatowsky
1945: She Gets Her Man as Boy
1945: There Goes Kelly as Sammy Cohn
1945: Patrick the Great as Tony (uncredited)
1945: The Horn Blows at Midnight as Trumpet Player (uncredited)
1945: On Stage Everybody as Radio Announcer (uncredited)
1948: The Judge Steps Out as Newsboy (uncredited)
1949: The Lucky Stiff as Bernstein
1952: The Sniper as Intern (uncredited)
1953: Walking My Baby Back Home as Walter Thomas
1954: Dragnet (TV Series)
1955: The Donald O'Connor Show (TV Series) as Minor Role
1958: The Bob Cummings Show (TV Series) as Roscoe Dewitt
1962: Experiment in Terror as The Drunk (uncredited)
1968: Yours, Mine and Ours as Dr. Ashford
1970: Which Way to the Front? as Adolf Hitler
1970-1974: Adam-12 (TV Series) as Man in Sewer / Marvin Weber / J. Simmons
1972: Everything You Always Wanted to Know About Sex* (*But Were Afraid to Ask) as George
1974: For Pete's Sake as Drunk Driver
1975: Marcus Welby, M.D. (TV Series) as Ben Leona
1975: Ellery Queen (TV Series) as Morgue Attendant
1977: The World's Greatest Lover as Man at the Table
1983: Star 80 as Nightclub Owner
1983–1985: Dungeons & Dragons (TV Series) as Dungeon Master (voice)
1984: The Challenge of the GoBots (TV Series) (voice)
1985-1986: Cagney & Lacey (TV Series) as Wino / Randolph
1986: Small Wonder (TV Series)
1986-1987: The Smurfs (TV Series) (voice)
1988: Memories of Me as Slow-Burn
1989: Little Nemo: Adventures in Slumberland as Oompe (voice)
1990: Father Dowling Mysteries (TV Series) as Sol

As director
1954–1955: The Donald O'Connor Show (TV Series)
1955–1957: The Mickey Mouse Club (TV Series)
1957: Walt Disney's Wonderful World of Color (TV Series)
1958–1960: Bachelor Father (TV Series)
1959: The 30 Foot Bride of Candy Rock
1959–1961: The Ann Sothern Show (TV Series)
1960: Peter Loves Mary (TV Series)
1963: My Favorite Martian (TV Series)
1965: Bewitched (TV Series)
1965: McHale's Navy (TV Series)
1965: Dr. Kildare (TV Series) 
1965: The Smothers Brothers Show (TV Series)
1965: My Mother the Car (TV Series)
1965: The Addams Family (TV Series)
1965–1966: Please Don't Eat the Daisies (TV Series)
1966: Honey West (TV Series)
1967: The Monkees (TV Series)
1967: Get Smart (TV Series)
1977: The Skatebirds (TV Series)

Composer and songwriter
1943: O, My Darling Clementine ("Diggin the Docey Doe")
1943: Moonlight in Vermont ("Something Tells Me", "Be A Good Girl", They Got Me in the Middle of Things", "Pickin' the Beets", "Dobbin and a Wagon of Hay", "After the Beat")
1944: This Is the Life ("Yippee-I-Voot", "Gremlin Walk")
1944: Follow the Boys ("Kittens With Their Mittens Laced")
1944: Hot Rhythm ("Shampoo Jingle")
1944: Hi, Good Lookin'! ("By Mistake")
1944: Chip Off the Old Block ("I've Gotta Give My Feet a Break")
1944: Sing a Jingle ("Sing a Jingle", "We're the Janes Who Make The Planes", "Mademoiselle")

References

External links
 
 

1916 births
2004 deaths
Male actors from Pennsylvania
American male film actors
American film directors
American male television actors
American television directors
American male radio actors
American male voice actors
American male screenwriters
Songwriters from Pennsylvania
Neurological disease deaths in California
Deaths from Parkinson's disease
20th-century American musicians
Screenwriters from Pennsylvania
20th-century American male actors
20th-century American male writers
20th-century American screenwriters